Ford Model B may refer to:
 Ford Model B (1904)
 Ford Model B (1932)